Intrigue at Oakhaven Plantation is 2006 point-and-click adventure game. It was a solo project of Cindy Pondillo; her second adventure.

Plot and gameplay 
Players take control of cousins Daphne and Dominic as they are invited to the Oakhaven Plantation and learn secrets about its past.

Critical reception 
Tom King of Adventure Gamers criticised its retro-style graphics and lack of voice acting, while Ryan Casey of Just Adventure praised Pondillo for completing the project by herself in a short amount of time.

References 

Adventure games